Corrales is a Spanish surname. Notable people with the surname include:

 Cristina Corrales (1962–2010), Bolivian journalist, radio broadcaster, and politician
 Diego Corrales (1977–2007), American boxer
 Enrique Corrales (born 1982), Spanish football (soccer) player
 Julien Corrales, French music producer
 Pat Corrales (born 1941), American baseball player
 Pilita Corrales (born 1939), Filipina singer
 Ramiro Corrales (born 1977), American soccer player
 Raydel Corrales (born 1982), Cuban volleyball player 
 Rudis Alberto Corrales Rivera (born 1979), El Salvador and CD Aguila football (soccer) player
 Sara Corrales (born 1984), Colombian actress, model, dancer and business owner

Spanish-language surnames